John, Jack, or Johnny Kelley may refer to:

Sports
Jack Kelley (ice hockey) (1927–2020), American ice hockey coach
John Kelley (ice hockey) (1907–1986), American ice hockey player
John J. Kelley (1930–2011), American runner, winner of the 1957 Boston Marathon; "Kelley the Younger"
Johnny Kelley (1907–2004), American runner, winner of the 1935 and 1945 Boston Marathons; "Kelley the Elder"

Other
John Kelley (criminal), reputed mobster who was an associate of the Patriarca crime family
John C. Kelley, American television writer and producer
John Edward Kelley (1853–1941), U.S. Representative from South Dakota
John L. Kelley (1916–1999), American mathematician
John William Kelley (born 1963), American serial killer
Jack Kelley (journalist), USA Today reporter
John Kelley (Medal of Honor), Irish-born recipient of the Medal of Honor

See also
 Jon Kelley (born 1965), American sports journalist, author, producer, and television personality
 John Kelly (disambiguation)
 John Calley (1930–2011), American film studio executive and producer
 John Calley (engineer) (1663–1725), British